This is a list of windmills in Belgium.<br/ >
Belgium is divided into three regions, two of which are subdivided into five provinces each.

Brussels-Capital Region

Flemish Region

Antwerp

East Flanders

Flemish Brabant

Limburg

West Flanders

French-speaking Region

Hainaut

Liège

Belgian Luxembourg 
No windmills standing in this province.

Namur

Walloon Brabant

Notes
Bold indicates a mill that is still standing. Italics indicates a mill with some remains surviving.

References 

 
 
Belgium